Lydia Murdock is an American pop singer. She is best known for her answer song to Michael Jackson's "Billie Jean", known as "Superstar", where she portrayed Billie Jean saying that she's "mad as hell" in the song's lyrics. The song was a hit, peaking at #14 in the UK in October 1983.

References

Year of birth missing (living people)
Living people
American women singers
21st-century American women